Beau Maister (born 20 March 1986 as Beau Wilkes) is an Australian rules footballer who played with St Kilda and the West Coast Eagles in the Australian Football League (AFL) and for the Claremont Football Club in the West Australian Football League (WAFL).

Playing career

2005-10: Career with West Coast
Maister, then known by his previous surname of Wilkes, was drafted from the rookie list by the Eagles in 2004, 2006 and for the third time following the 2007 season and finally made his AFL debut in the Eagles' upset victory over Adelaide at Subiaco Oval in Round 9 of the 2008 AFL season. He was delisted at the end of 2010.

2011: Career with Claremont (WAFL)
In 2011, Maister played in Claremont's WAFL premiership side. He kicked five goals and was awarded the Simpson Medal as the best player on the ground.

2012-14: Career with St Kilda
In Round 5, 2012, he played his first game for St Kilda and impressed, kicking three goals before being subbed off.

On 22 June 2014, Maister announced his immediate retirement after 44 games in six seasons at the top level.

Personal life
Maister's mother is a New Zealander. On 6 February 2013, Maister legally changed his name from Beau Wilkes to Beau Maister to keep his mother's maiden name alive.

References

External links

1986 births
Living people
West Coast Eagles players
Claremont Football Club players
Australian rules footballers from Western Australia
People from Albany, Western Australia
St Kilda Football Club players
Australian people of New Zealand descent
Sandringham Football Club players